Following is a list of CONCACAF competitions.  The Confederation of North, Central American and Caribbean Association Football (CONCACAF) is the continental governing body for association football in North America, Central America and the Caribbean. Three South American entities, the independent nations of Guyana and Suriname and the French department of French Guiana, are also members.

Domestic cups

Leagues

Notes
The Bermuda Hogges play in the USL Premier Development League, a part of the US Association Association Football Pyramid
Major League Soccer and USL League One have Canadian teams, although they are primarily United States leagues.

References

 
Association football-related lists